Rufus Jones for President is a 1933 American Pre-Code satirical musical-comedy, clocking in at 21 minutes. The film was directed by Roy Mack, and starred Ethel Waters and Sammy Davis Jr., in his first onscreen appearance, as the title character.

The film's tone may appear racially insensitive to some of today's audiences. The film is considered an important musical short. This film is available on YouTube.

Synopsis
Rufus Jones, an African American child, is elected president of the United States in this short musical comedy, which features song and dance numbers by seven-year-old Sammy Davis Jr.

Home media
Rufus Jones for President was released on the six-disc Big Band, Jazz & Swing set of short subjects by Warner Archive Collection.

References

External links

1933 films
1933 musical comedy films
African-American films
American musical comedy films
American black-and-white films
Vitaphone short films
Warner Bros. short films
Films about fictional presidents of the United States
Films directed by Roy Mack
1930s English-language films
1930s American films